Savely Alekseyevich Kozlov (born 19 January 1997) is a Russian football player.

Club career
He made his debut in the Russian Football National League for FC Tyumen on 4 March 2018 in a game against FC Olimpiyets Nizhny Novgorod.

He made his Russian Premier League debut for FC Orenburg on 11 March 2019 in a game against FC Krasnodar, as a starter.

References

External links
 Profile by Russian Football National League

1997 births
People from Reutov
Living people
Russian footballers
PFC Krylia Sovetov Samara players
PFC CSKA Moscow players
FC Tyumen players
FC Orenburg players
Association football defenders
Russian Premier League players
Sportspeople from Moscow Oblast